Below is a listing of all South African rugby union players that have represented the South Africa Under-20 side since the World Rugby Under 20 Championship competition was launched in 2008.

The "Years" column indicates the tournament(s) in which each player played.

See also
 South Africa national under-20 rugby union team
 IRB Junior World Championship

References

External links
 

under